The 2000–01 QMJHL season was the 32nd season in the history of the Quebec Major Junior Hockey League. Sixteen teams played 72 games each in the schedule. The Shawinigan Cataractes finished first overall in the regular season, winning their second Jean Rougeau Trophy.

Simon Gamache of the Val-d'Or Foreurs is the top scorer in the league, wins the regular season and playoff MVP awards, and three other individual awards at the season's end. Gamache helped Val-d'Or win their second President's Cup, defeating the Acadie-Bathurst Titan in the finals.

Final standings
Note: GP = Games played; W = Wins; L = Losses; T = Ties; OTL = Overtime loss; PTS = Points; GF = Goals for; GA = Goals against

Lebel Conference

Dilio Conference

 
complete list of standings.

Scoring leaders
Note: GP = Games played; G = Goals; A = Assists; Pts = Points; PIM = Penalty minutes

 complete scoring statistics

Playoffs
Simon Gamache was the leading scorer of the playoffs with 57 points (22 goals, 35 assists), setting the QMJHL playoff points record.

All-star teams
First team
 Goaltender - Frédéric Cloutier, Shawinigan Cataractes
 Left defence - Danny Groulx, Victoriaville Tigres
 Right defence - Marc-André Bergeron, Shawinigan Cataractes
 Left winger - Simon Gamache, Val-d'Or Foreurs
 Centreman - Brandon Reid, Val-d'Or Foreurs
 Right winger - Radim Vrbata, Shawinigan Cataractes
 Coach - Denis Francoeur, Shawinigan Cataractes

Second team
 Goaltender - Maxime Ouellet, Rouyn-Noranda Huskies
 Left defence - Alexandre Vigneault, Acadie-Bathurst Titan
 Right defence - Chris Lyness, Montreal Rocket / Val-d'Or Foreurs
 Left winger - Jason King, Halifax Mooseheads
 Centreman - Dominic Forget, Shawinigan Cataractes
 Right winger - Marc-André Thinel, Victoriaville Tigres
 Coach - Claude Bouchard, Val-d'Or Foreurs

Rookie team
 Goaltender - Adam Russo, Acadie-Bathurst Titan
 Left defence - Francis Trudel, Sherbrooke Castors
 Right defence - Tomas Malec, Rimouski Océanic
 Left winger - Martin Frolik, Drummondville Voltigeurs
 Centreman - Pierre-Marc Bouchard, Chicoutimi Saguenéens
 Right winger - Ales Hemsky, Hull Olympiques
 Coach - Claude Bouchard, Val-d'Or Foreurs
 List of First/Second/Rookie team all-stars.

Trophies and awards
Team
President's Cup - Playoff Champions, Val-d'Or Foreurs
Jean Rougeau Trophy - Regular Season Champions, Shawinigan Cataractes
Robert Lebel Trophy - Team with best GAA, Shawinigan Cataractes

Player
Michel Brière Memorial Trophy - Most Valuable Player, Simon Gamache, Val-d'Or Foreurs
Jean Béliveau Trophy - Top Scorer, Simon Gamache, Val-d'Or Foreurs
Guy Lafleur Trophy - Playoff MVP, Simon Gamache, Val-d'Or Foreurs
Telus Cup – Offensive - Offensive Player of the Year, Simon Gamache, Val-d'Or Foreurs
Telus Cup – Defensive - Defensive Player of the Year, Maxime Ouellet, Rouyn-Noranda Huskies
AutoPro Plaque - Best plus/minus total, Simon Gamache, Val-d'Or Foreurs
Philips Plaque - Best faceoff percentage, Pierre-Luc Emond, Drummondville Voltigeurs
Jacques Plante Memorial Trophy - Best GAA, Frédéric Cloutier, Shawinigan Cataractes
Emile Bouchard Trophy - Defenceman of the Year, Marc-André Bergeron, Shawinigan Cataractes
Mike Bossy Trophy - Best Pro Prospect, Ales Hemsky, Hull Olympiques
RDS Cup - Rookie of the Year, Pierre-Marc Bouchard, Chicoutimi Saguenéens
Michel Bergeron Trophy - Offensive Rookie of the Year, Pierre-Marc Bouchard, Chicoutimi Saguenéens
Raymond Lagacé Trophy - Defensive Rookie of the Year, Tomas Malec, Rimouski Océanic
Frank J. Selke Memorial Trophy - Most sportsmanlike player, Brandon Reid, Val-d'Or Foreurs
QMJHL Humanitarian of the Year - Humanitarian of the Year, Ali MacEachern, Halifax Mooseheads
Marcel Robert Trophy - Best Scholastic Player, Jean-Philippe Brière, Rimouski Océanic
Paul Dumont Trophy - Personality of the Year, Simon Gamache, Val-d'Or Foreurs

Executive
Ron Lapointe Trophy - Coach of the Year, Denis Francoeur, Shawinigan Cataractes
John Horman Trophy - Executive of the Year, Mario Boucher, Shawinigan Cataractes
St-Clair Group Plaque - Marketing Director of the Year, Éric Forest, Rimouski Océanic

See also
2001 Memorial Cup
2001 NHL Entry Draft
2000–01 OHL season
2000–01 WHL season

References
 Official QMJHL Website
 www.hockeydb.com/

Quebec Major Junior Hockey League seasons
QMJHL